Ello is a comune (municipality) in the Province of Lecco in the Italian region Lombardy, located about  northeast of Milan and about  southwest of Lecco.

Ello borders the following municipalities: Colle Brianza, Dolzago, Galbiate, Oggiono.

Demographic evolution

References

Cities and towns in Lombardy